Robert Padilla Jr. (February 11, 1936 – October 15, 2007) was an American gridiron football coach. He served as the head football coach at California State University, Fresno from 1978 to 1979, compiling a record of 7–15.

Head coaching record

College

References

1936 births
2007 deaths
Arizona State Sun Devils football coaches
Fresno State Bulldogs football coaches
Fresno State Bulldogs football players
High school football coaches in California
Houston Oilers coaches
Sportspeople from Santa Ana, California
Washington State Cougars football coaches
Wichita State Shockers football coaches
Winnipeg Blue Bombers coaches